Iran–Switzerland relations are foreign relations between the Islamic Republic of Iran and the Swiss Confederation.

Switzerland has had a consulate in Tehran since 1919 which was raised to the status of embassy in 1936 and also represents the interests of the United States and Saudi Arabia in Tehran. Switzerland has also represented Iran in Canada, Israel, and Saudi Arabia.

History

Notable Monarchy-era Iranians who lived and studied in Switzerland 
Former Iranian Prime Minister, Mohammad Mosaddegh obtained his Doctorate of Laws (doctorat en droit) at the University of Neuchâtel in Switzerland, 1911.
As a child, Mohammad Reza Pahlavi, the Shah of Iran attended Institut Le Rosey, a Swiss boarding school, completing his studies there in 1935.

1979 Revolution
Switzerland becomes the "protecting power" of the United States in Iran after the Iranian Revolution of 1979.

Since May 1980, the Swiss embassy in Tehran has been consistently relaying diplomatic communications between Iran and the United States.

Iran–Iraq war
Beginning in 1984, victims of the Iran–Iraq War received medical treatment in neutral Switzerland, while Swiss companies were doing multibillion-dollar business with Iraq at the same time.  Cooperation on the national level to prevent natural catastrophes was initiated in 2006.

Murder of Kazem Rajavi
Ali Fallahian, an Iranian politician and cleric who served as a member of the 3rd Assembly of Experts of the IRI and as the Minister of Intelligence of Islamic Republic of Iran in cabinet of President Hashemi Rafsanjani was charged by a Swiss court with masterminding the assassination of Kazem Rajavi, a brother of Mujahedin-e Khalq leader Massoud Rajavi, near Geneva in broad daylight by several agents on April 24, 1990.

Crypto AG and espionage case
In 1992, Hans Buehler an employee of Swiss firm Crypto AG was detained in Iran on charges of espionage. He was later released by the Iranian authorities after the firm paid a 1 million dollar bond. Soon after Buehler's release Crypto AG dismissed him and charged him the $1m. Swiss media and the German magazine Der Spiegel took up his case in 1994, pursuing the question of whether Crypto's machines had in fact been rigged by Western intelligence (namely the NSA). In 2020, a Swiss parliamentary investigation revealed that in fact "Swiss intelligence service were aware of and benefited from the Zug-based firm Crypto AG’s involvement in the US-led spying".

Friedrich Tinner, the Iranian nuclear program and the CIA
Friedrich Tinner is a Swiss engineer, connected with the Khan network trafficking in the proliferation of nuclear materials and know-how to Pakistan, Iran, Libya, and North Korea. He has been connected in particular with gas centrifuges used for isotopic enrichment of uranium. In May 2008, the President of the Swiss Confederation, Pascal Couchepin announced that the Tinner files, believed to number around 30,000 documents, had been shredded. It is alleged that this was a cover-up, to hide the involvement of Urs Tinner with the CIA.

Swiss diplomat arrested on sexual charges
In February 2009, the Iranian police arrested Marco Kämpf, the Swiss diplomat acting as the First Secretary of the US Interests, on sex charges after finding him with an Iranian woman in a car. The diplomat was recalled to Switzerland.

Human rights dialogue and the 2009 Swiss vote on minarets

The two countries have been engaged in a human rights dialogue since 2003 and in discussions on migration since 2005. Following a constitutional amendment banning the construction of new minarets in Switzerland in 2009, Iran described the Swiss vote as "Islamophobic" and a blow to religious freedom.

Security incidences at the Iranian embassy in Bern
In November 2011, Swiss police investigated two minor attacks on the Iranian Embassy in Bern.

On 1 October 2022, Swiss police had to use rubber bullets to disperse a crowd of a thousand protesters in front of the Iranian embassy in Bern. The demonstrators protested against the death of a young woman in Iranian police custody the month before.

Tax evasion 

In 2014, international medias reported Iranian nationals to be listed among the tax evaders in Switzerland.

Death of Swiss diplomat

In 2021, Iranian authorities found the dead body of a Swiss diplomat at the base of a tower in Tehran. The cause of the fall was “unknown”.

Trade

Oil trade

Marc Rich, a US-Israeli businessman with international ties, entered Iran through his Glencore company headquartered in Switzerland. Rich ignored US and international sanctions on Iran and became the major trader of Iranian oil for 15 years.

Arms trade with Israel and Swiss banks

The Observer estimated that Israel-based private arms dealers sold Iran US-made weapons during the Iran–Iraq War totaled US$500 million annually, to supply Iran's Shah-based arsenal at the time. Time magazine reported that throughout 1981 and 1982, "the Israelis reportedly set up Swiss bank accounts to handle the financial end of the deals”.

Trade agreements

There are agreements between the two countries on air traffic (1954, 1972 and 2004), road and rail transport (1977), export risk guarantees (1966), protection of investments (1998) and double taxation (2002). Iran is one of Switzerland's most important trading partners in the Middle East. Swiss-Iranian economic treaties already exist for investment protection, double taxation and aviation. A trade agreement was signed in 2005 but has not yet been ratified. In 2010, the volume of trade with Iran was about 741 million Swiss francs; Switzerland exported goods for about 700 million francs, and it has imported goods to 41 million Swiss francs. The main goods exported by Switzerland are pharmaceutical products, machinery and agricultural products. Switzerland exports to Iran totaled nearly US$1.9 billion in the ten-month period ending on January 31, 2014. In 2017, Iran continued to import a significant amount of Swiss goods and services worth US$2.18 billion (4.3% of total imports) while Iranian exports to Switzerland only accounted for US$12 million during the same time period. According to national statistics, both exports from the EU and Switzerland to Iran dropped sharply after 2017, including those for pharmaceutical products. In early 2020, Geneva-based bank BCP and a large Swiss drugmaker were participating in the initial pilot shipment of essential medicines worth 2.3 million euros ($2.55 million). In July 2020, the State Secretariat for Economic Affairs (SECO) announced that the first transaction under the humanitarian trade agreement had been completed. In October 2020, the Trump administration further expanded U.S. sanctions to all Iranian financial institutions, thereby complicating additional exports under the agreement. In 2021, the Iran-Switzerland Chamber of Commerce noted an uptick in the trade between the two countries despite challenging banking operations. IRNA reported an increase of imports from Switzerland to 672,000 tons ($539 million) during the first four months of 2021, mostly in form of medical products and organic cereal. In 2021, Switzerland has become the fifth largest exporter to Iran, after the UAE, China, Turkey and the European Union.

2007 gas contract

In the year 2007, Iran and Switzerland signed a major 25-year gas contract to export over 5 billion cubic meters of gas per year from the Persian Gulf reportedly valued at 18 billion euros. Starting with 1.5 billion cubic meters per year in 2010, to be increased to 4 bcm by 2012. This contract has been signed between the Switzerland's company of Elektrizitätsgesellschaft Laufenburg (EGL) and the National Iranian Gas Export Company which will be started practically at the beginning of 2009. There is some skepticism that Iran will not be able to supply gas to Switzerland for the foreseeable future because no pipeline connects Iran to Europe at present. In February 2010, Iran announced it is ready for gas export to Switzerland.
The deal was aimed at reducing Bern's dependency on Russian gas. In October 2010, EGL announced the unilateral suspension of the gas contract with Iran.

International sanctions

Switzerland and Iran have greatly reduced their bilateral economic cooperation since the UN Security Council took up Iran's nuclear enrichment program in 2005. The Swiss government has been cooperating with the U.S. to freeze banking accounts and other financial assets belonging to individuals involved in the Iranian nuclear program; Switzerland has also committed to block the sale of dual-use items. Vitol and Glencore, 2 Swiss-based firms, were also major re-sellers of gasoline to Iran until recently but have since stopped trading with the country. In January and December 2011, Switzerland expanded its unilateral sanctions against Iran. The Swiss Federal Council said in a statement in January 2014 that it had suspended part of its economic sanctions against Iran in accordance with the Geneva nuclear accords between Tehran and the six world powers but the trade barriers are still officially in place. Based on a statement by Swiss President Didier Burkhalter at the 9th World Economic Forum, it will be a step by step process and the official removal of all trade sanctions will depend on the final agreement about Iran's nuclear program. The adoption of the Joint Comprehensive Plan of Action (JCPOA) took place in the Swiss city of Geneva and the general framework of the current agreement was concluded on April 2, 2015 in Lausanne. In 2016, following the implementation of the JCPOA with P5+1, Switzerland lifted all unilateral sanctions against Iran pertaining to its nuclear program and Johann Schneider-Ammann became the first ever Swiss president to visit Iran.

After the Trump administration unilaterally canceled the Joint Comprehensive Plan of Action (JCPOA), economic sanctions were reimposed in 2018, and further tightened in late 2019 by designating the Central Bank of Iran (CBI) under U.S. counterterrorism authorities, as well as imposing restrictions on cargo shipping from and to Iran. Swiss food and pharmaceutical companies have continued to do business with Iran, but due to the strict financial sanctions, even payments for exempt goods were difficult to process by Iranian and Swiss banks.

In November 2022, Switzerland adopted additional EU sanctions against Shahed Aviation Industries, the manufacturer of the Shahed drones, used by Russia in its war against Ukraine, as well as three senior Iranian military officers. But Switzerland did not impose additional EU sanctions following the death of Mahsa Amini as the 'diplomatic approach' was given priority. Switzerland holds several protecting power mandates carried out on behalf of Iran.

Humanitarian channel

In late January 2020, the Swiss Humanitarian Trade Arrangement (SHTA) with Iran was implemented, assuring export guarantees through Swiss financial institutions for shipments of food and medical products to the Islamic republic.

On 15 June 2021, Swiss Foreign Minister Ignazio Cassis and US president Joe Biden said during a press interview in Geneva, Switzerland, they would both support more payments through the rarely used Swiss-Iranian humanitarian channel.

See also
Foreign relations of Iran
Foreign relations of Switzerland
Johann Rudolf Stadler
Naftiran Intertrade
Pizza Connection Trial
EU-Iran Forum
Swiss Iranian Investment Forum

References

External links

Bilateral relations Switzerland-Iran Swiss federal administration
Iran–Switzerland relations – American Enterprise Institute
Iran-Switzerland Chamber of Commerce

 
Switzerland
Bilateral relations of Switzerland